This is a list of notable alumni which includes graduates, non-graduate former students, and current students of Centenary Biblical Institute (1867–1890), Morgan College (1890–1938), Morgan State College (1938–1975), and Morgan State University (1975–present). Located in residential Baltimore, Maryland, Morgan State is a historically black university and Maryland's designated public urban university. The Morgan State University National Alumni Association is the official alumni organization of the university.

See also Morgan State University alumni.

Arts, news, entertainment, media, and publishing

Education, science

Judiciary

Military

Generals

Police

Politics

Sports

References